Rodges Run is a tributary of the Delaware River in Durham Township, Bucks County, Pennsylvania in the United States.

Statistics
Rodges run was entered into the Geographic Names Information System by the U.S. Geological Survey on 30 August 1990 as identification number 1212006.

Course
Rodges Run rises near the center of Durham Township east of Lehnenberg, and runs generally east northeast, then skirts south and east around an elevation before it drains into the Pennsylvania Canal (Delaware Division).

Geology
Rodges Run rises in a bed of Hornblende Gneiss laid down during the Precambrian, the hornblende is mixed in with labradorite, the grains are about 1 to 2 mm in diameter. Then it moves into a bed of the Leithsville Formation consisting of dolomite, calcareous shale, and chert.

Crossings and Bridges

See also
List of rivers of the United States
List of rivers of Pennsylvania
List of Delaware River tributaries

References

Rivers of Bucks County, Pennsylvania
Rivers of Pennsylvania
Tributaries of the Delaware River